Stephen "Steve" Laycock (born October 29, 1982 in Yorkton, Saskatchewan) is a Canadian curler from Saskatoon. He currently skips his own team out of Saskatoon.

Career
In 2003, Laycock skipped Team Saskatchewan to a Canadian Junior Curling Championship and a World Junior Curling Championship. Until 2007 he tried repeatedly to skip a team to the provincial men's championship in 2004, 2005 and 2006, but was unsuccessful in all of his attempts. In 2006 he joined up with Pat Simmons as his lead, and finally won a provincial championship with him in 2007. He would win again in 2008 and once more in 2011, this time throwing third stones and calling the game for Simmons. Simmons left the team at the end of the 2010-11 season, leaving Laycock to find a replacement third. Laycock announced the addition of Joel Jordison to his team for the 2011-2012 season. Jordison and second Brennen Jones left the team after that season.

Laycock represented Saskatchewan at the 2014 Tim Hortons Brier after winning the provincial championship in Shaunavon on February 2, 2014. He led the province to a 6-5 record, narrowly missing the playoffs.

Laycock also represented Saskatchewan at the 2015 Tim Hortons Brier. Laycock would finish round-robin with a 7-4 record (3rd place). In the 3v4 game, Laycock had a chance for three in the tenth end to win the game, but missed it only getting two points. He then lost in the extra end. In the Bronze medal game against Gushue of NL, Laycock once again had a chance for the win by getting two, but missed it. In the eleventh end, Saskatchewan would steal two to pick up the bronze medal.

After representing Saskatchewan two more times at the Brier, his team broke up in 2018. He then joined the Jim Cotter rink based out of British Columbia.

Personal life
Laycock is employed as a compensation manager at the University of Saskatchewan. He is married and has one child.

Grand Slam record

Notes

References

External links
 

1982 births
Living people
Sportspeople from Yorkton
Curlers from Saskatoon
Canadian male curlers
Canada Cup (curling) participants
Competitors at the 2007 Winter Universiade
21st-century Canadian people